André Venceslau Valentim Macanga, better known as André Macanga (born 14 May 1978), is a former Angolan football midfielder and a current coach.

Career
Macanga was born in Luanda, Angola. After playing in Portugal for many years, Macanga also played in Kuwait and Turkey before retiring in 2012.

International
He is a member of the National team and was called up to the 2006 World Cup. André is known in the Angola national football team, as the "defensive lung" of the team.

Career statistics

National team statistics

International goals

References

External links
 

1978 births
Living people
Footballers from Luanda
Angolan footballers
Angola international footballers
Angolan expatriate footballers
S.C. Salgueiros players
Boavista F.C. players
FC Porto players
Vitória S.C. players
F.C. Alverca players
Associação Académica de Coimbra – O.A.F. players
Gaziantepspor footballers
Primeira Liga players
Süper Lig players
Expatriate footballers in Turkey
Expatriate footballers in Kuwait
2006 FIFA World Cup players
2006 Africa Cup of Nations players
2008 Africa Cup of Nations players
2012 Africa Cup of Nations players
Association football defenders
Association football midfielders
Al Salmiya SC players
Al Jahra SC players
Kuwait SC players
Angolan expatriate sportspeople in Kuwait
Angolan expatriate sportspeople in Turkey
Angolan expatriate sportspeople in Portugal
Angola national football team managers